The 2013–14 Northwestern State Lady Demons basketball team represented Northwestern State University during the 2013–14 NCAA Division I women's basketball season. The Demons, led by second year co-head coaches Brooke Stoehr and Scott Stoehr, played their home games at Prather Coliseum and are members of the Southland Conference.  As champions of the 2014 Southland Conference women's basketball tournament, the Lady Demons received the conference automatic bid to the 2014 NCAA Division I women's basketball tournament.

Roster

Media
Select Lady Demon basketball games can be listened to with a Northwestern feed at Demons Showcase. Many opponents have an audio stream available to listen to the games live that aren't done on Demons Showcase. NSU TV will also broadcast most of the Lady Demons wins tape delayed.

Schedule

|-
!colspan=9| Regular Season

|-
!colspan=9| 2014 Southland Conference women's basketball tournament

|-
!colspan=9| 2014 NCAA women's basketball tournament

See also
2013–14 Northwestern State Demons basketball team

References

Northwestern State
Northwestern State Lady Demons basketball seasons
Northwestern State